Macomona liliana, or the large wedge shell, is a bivalve mollusc of the family Tellinidae. It is endemic to New Zealand.

References

Tellinidae
Bivalves of New Zealand
Bivalves described in 1815